George W. Dunne (February 20, 1913 – May 28, 2006) was an American politician within the Democratic Party from Chicago, Illinois. He was President of the Cook County Board of Commissioners from 1969 to 1991; the longest service of anyone holding that office.

Early life
He was born in the Near North Side of Chicago, one of eight children of John and Ellen Dunne. His father died when he was twelve years old. He graduated from De La Salle Institute and attended Northwestern University for a year but dropped out. He became active in Democratic politics and was employed by the Park District, an agency in which many Democratic precinct captains were given patronage jobs. During World War II and the Korean War he served overseas as a member of the Illinois Air National Guard's 126th Fighter-Bomber Wing.

Political career
He was appointed to a vacant seat in the Illinois House of Representatives in 1955, and was re-elected in 1956, 1958, 1960, and 1962. After eight years he became floor leader for the House Democrats.

In 1963 Chicago Mayor Richard J. Daley appointed him to a seat on the Cook County Board.

Cook County Board President
In 1969, he became President of the Cook County Board of Commissioners, succeeding Richard B. Ogilvie, who had been elected Governor. Despite periodic revelations of questionable financial dealings, of which he was continuously cleared (Dunne owned and operated an insurance agency throughout his career in elected office), Dunne was re-elected in 1970, 1974, 1978, 1982, and 1986. He was seen as a potential successor to Mayor Daley. Dunne succeeded Daley as Chairman of the Cook County Democratic Committee in 1976 after Daley's death. In 1982, Dunne lost the party chairmanship to Alderman Edward Vrdolyak, an ally of Mayor Jane Byrne. Dunne was aligned with Chicago's first African-American Mayor Harold Washington during the Council Wars period and was re-elected to the party chairmanship after Vrdolyak resigned following his defeat by Washington in the 1987 Mayoral election.

Pushing 80 and yet enmeshed in a scandal in which he admitted having sex with female county employees (The Chicago Tribune printed a correction that these women were not pressured into providing sexual favors to him) Dunne decided to retire and did not seek re-election to the County Board Presidency or party chairmanship in 1990. However, he stayed on as Democratic ward committeeman of Chicago's 42nd Ward, a post he had held since 1961. Dunne was repeatedly re-elected to this position until he resigned in 2003. He died on his farm in Hebron, Illinois on May 28, 2006.

Death and legacy 
Dunne died in 2006 on his farm in Hebron, Illinois. The Cook County administration building at 69 West Washington Street (originally the headquarters of the Brunswick Corporation) was renamed in his honor and bears his portrait in the lobby.  On June 1, 2006, there was a funeral mass at Holy Name Cathedral, followed by entombment All Saints Mausoleum.

His son George became an actor and musician under the name Murphy Dunne, appearing in the Chicago-based Blues Brothers movies.

References

1913 births
2006 deaths
De La Salle Institute alumni
Members of the Illinois House of Representatives
Presidents of the Cook County Board of Commissioners
Politicians from Chicago
20th-century American politicians
People from Hebron, Illinois
Northwestern University alumni
Military personnel from Illinois